Oh Yun-suk (born 1 March 1984) is a South Korean male handball player who competed in the 2004 Summer Olympics.

References

1984 births
Living people
South Korean male handball players
Olympic handball players of South Korea
Handball players at the 2004 Summer Olympics
Asian Games medalists in handball
Handball players at the 2010 Asian Games
Handball players at the 2014 Asian Games
Asian Games gold medalists for South Korea
Asian Games silver medalists for South Korea
Medalists at the 2010 Asian Games
Medalists at the 2014 Asian Games
South Korean Buddhists
21st-century South Korean people